Events from the year 1833 in Ireland.

Events
 August – Mount Melleray Abbey in the Knockmealdown Mountains is founded, the first Cistercian foundation in Ireland in modern times.
 10 August – major fire in stores of The Custom House, Dublin, sets River Liffey aflame.
 14 August – Church Temporalities Act 1833 suppresses ten bishoprics in the Church of Ireland, with dioceses to be merged as sees fall vacant, and provides for abolition of Vestry Assessment.
 28 August – the school which will evolve into Castleknock College is opened in Dublin by the Vincentian community.
 Katherine Sophia Kane's The Irish Flora is published anonymously.

Arts and literature
 Early – Gustavus Vaughan Brooke, aged 14, makes his stage debut, at the Dublin Theatre, playing William Tell.

Births
21 January – Joseph Prosser, recipient of the Victoria Cross for gallantry in 1855 at Sevastopol, Crimea (died 1869).
8 February – Launt Thompson, sculptor (died 1894).
4 May – Michael N. Nolan, U.S. Representative from New York, mayor of Albany (died 1905).
29 May – William Hare, 3rd Earl of Listowel, peer and Liberal politician (died 1924).
4 June – Garnet Wolseley, 1st Viscount Wolseley, soldier (died 1913).
17 July – Hugh Talbot Burgoyne, recipient of the Victoria Cross for gallantry in 1855 in the Sea of Azov, Crimea (died 1870).
3 November – William Knox Leet, recipient of the Victoria Cross for gallantry in 1879 at Inhlobana, Zululand, South Africa (died 1898).
7 November – William Temple, recipient of the Victoria Cross for gallantry in 1863 at Rangiriri, New Zealand (died 1919).
Sir Theobald Hubert Burke, 13th Baronet (died 1909).
Henry James O'Farrell, would-be assassin (executed 1868 in Australia).

Deaths
28 March – William Thompson, political and philosophical writer and social reformer (born 1775).
3 May – Nicholas Tuite MacCarthy, Jesuit preacher (born 1769).

In fiction
Brian Friel's play Translations (premiered 1980) is set in County Donegal in 1833.

References

 
Years of the 19th century in Ireland
1830s in Ireland
Ireland
 Ireland